This is a list of the gymnasts who represented their country at the 1948 Summer Olympics in London from 29 July to 14 August 1948. Only one discipline, artistic gymnastics, was included in the Games.

Female artistic gymnasts

Male artistic gymnasts

References 

Lists of gymnasts
Gymnastics at the 1948 Summer Olympics